Sand Fire may refer to:
 Sand Fire (2016), a wildfire that burned in California in 2016
 Sand Fire (2019), a wildfire that burned in California in 2019

All disambiguation pages